The 1963 Davis Cup was the 52nd edition of the Davis Cup, the most important tournament between national teams in men's tennis. 32 teams entered the Europe Zone, 9 teams entered the Eastern Zone, and 7 teams entered the America Zone. Rhodesia made its first appearance in the tournament.

The United States defeated Venezuela in the America Zone final, India defeated Japan in the Eastern Zone final, and Great Britain defeated Sweden in the Europe Zone final. In the Inter-Zonal Zone, the United States defeated Great Britain in the semifinal, and then defeated India in the final. The United States then defeated the defending champions Australia in the Challenge Round, ending Australia's four-year title run. The final was played at Memorial Drive Park in Adelaide, Australia on 26–28 December.

America Zone

Draw

Final
United States vs. Venezuela

Eastern Zone

Draw

Final
Japan vs. India

Europe Zone

Draw

Final
Great Britain vs. Sweden

Inter-Zonal Zone

Draw

Semifinals
Great Britain vs. United States

Final
India vs. United States

Challenge Round
Australia vs. United States

References

External links
Davis Cup Official Website

 
Davis Cups by year
Davis Cup
Davis Cup
Davis Cup
Davis Cup
Davis Cup
Davis Cup